Behind You is a 2011 Ecuadorian drama film written and directed by Tito Jara.

Cast
 Lily Alejandra as Yahaira
 Nicolás Hogan as Luis Alberto Granada de la Roca
 Jenny Nava as Greta
 Gabino Torres as Jorge Chicaiza Cisneros

References

External links
 

2011 films
2011 drama films
2010s Spanish-language films
Ecuadorian drama films